Daniel Orme (1766–1837) was an English artist, publisher and official Historical Engraver to George III and the Prince of Wales, the future George IV.

Early life
Orme was born in Manchester in 1766, the second of six children born to Aaron Orme (1707-82) a fustian manufacturer and his third wife, Margaret Walmsley (1739-1808). A portrait of Aaron by Joseph Wright survives, naming him as the Master of the Cheshire Fox Hounds.

Orme's father encouraged his interest in an artistic career. Two of Orme's younger brothers, Edward and William were also artists, his brother Robert was a solicitor for the British East India Company.

Career
Orme entered the Royal Academy Schools in London in on 7 March 1785, where he studied for several years, competing for the Royal Academy Gold Medal in 1788.

Orme began work as en etcher, but also worked as a painter, painting portraits and miniatures. His main output was as an engraver and publisher however, producing a large number of historical, topographical and ornamental prints. Orme is particularly known for his images of contemporary military heroes, including Captain John Hunter, Admiral Richard Howe and Horatio Nelson. He has two paintings in the National Maritime Museum.

Orme exhibited eleven portraits at the Royal Academy between 1797 and 1801. He and his brother Edward worked together on several occasions, printing and publishing each other's work. He also worked with the American born artist Mather Brown over several years.

In October 1814 Orme returned to Manchester, where he gave lessons drawing, etching and oil painting and continued to work as a portrait painter. He exhibited a work at the first exhibition of the Royal Manchester Institution, a portrait entitled 'William Butterworth, the Oldham Hermit', in 1827.

Works

Portrait of Olaudah Equiano, known as Gustavus Vassa, after W. Denton, 1789
James Cecil, 1st Marquess of Salisbury, 1796
Admiral Adam Duncan, 1797
Admiral de Winter, 1797
Horatio Nelson, 1798
Sir Henry Trollope, 1798
Sir John Borlase Warren
Jack Crawford, 1804

Personal life
Orme married Ann Barr at St George's Church in Hanover Square on 25 Jun 1787. They had eight children, five daughters and three sons. He sketched himself and one of his daughters attending an archery day held at the Duke of Devonshire's residence in Derbyshire, Chatsworth, in 1823. Orme was "...on the spot for the express purpose.." of capturing the events and people in attendance.

In 1814 Orme was held for a time in Fleet Prison for unpaid debts, as recorded in The London Gazette.

Orme died at Buxton in Derbyshire in 1837 and was survived by Ann.

Notes and sources 

1766 births
1837 deaths
English artists
English engravers
Alumni of the Royal Academy Schools